is the debut studio album by Japanese singer Hiroko Moriguchi, released through Starchild Records on LP on November 21, 1985, and on CD on December 5, 1985. The album's title track was co-written by Neil Sedaka and used as the second opening theme of the 1985 anime series Mobile Suit Zeta Gundam.

Track listing 
All tracks are arranged by Kōji Makaino.

References

External links 
 Official website
 
 

1985 debut albums
Hiroko Moriguchi albums
Japanese-language albums
King Records (Japan) albums